Amara  praetermissa  is a species of ground beetle native to Europe.

References

praetermissa
Beetles described in 1827
Beetles of Europe